In response to the Stamp and Tea Acts, the Declaration of Rights and Grievances was a document written by the Stamp Act Congress and passed on October 14, 1765. American colonists opposed the acts because they were passed without the consideration of the colonists’ opinion (“No Taxation without Representation”). The Declaration of Rights raised fourteen points of colonial protest but was not directed exclusively at the Stamp Act of 1765, which required that documents, newspapers, and playing cards be printed on special stamped and taxed paper. In addition to the specific protests of the Stamp Act taxes, it made the assertions which follow:

Colonists owe to the crown "the same allegiance" owed by "subjects born within the realm".
Colonists owe to Parliament "all due subordination".
Colonists possessed all the rights of Englishmen.
Trial by jury is a right.
The use of Admiralty Courts was abusive.
Without voting rights, Parliament could not represent the colonists.
There should be no taxation without representation.
Only the colonial assemblies had a right to tax the colonies.

See also

Continental Association
Petition to the King (1774)
Conciliatory Resolution
Olive Branch Petition
Hutchinson Letters Affair

References
The American Journey Brief 3rd Edition, Published by Prentice Hall

External links

Full text
Declaration of Rights and Grievances, October 14, 1774. Library of Congress

1765 in the Thirteen Colonies
History of the Thirteen Colonies
American Enlightenment
1765 documents